Odaia may refer to several places in Moldova:

Odaia, a village in Şişcani Commune, Nisporeni district
Odaia, a village in Alcedar Commune, Şoldăneşti district

and in Romania:

 Odaia Banului, a village in Țintești Commune, Buzău County
 Odaia Turcului, a village in Mătăsaru Commune, Dâmboviţa County
 Odaia Manolache, a village in Vânători Commune, Galați County
 Odaia Bogdana, a village in Fălciu Commune, Vaslui County
 Odaia Bursucani, a village in Grivița Commune, Vaslui County